Mike Kim (born December 11, 1976) is a bestselling author, inspirational speaker, consultant, NGO founder, and North Korea specialist. He is a Korean-American who, in 2003, moved to the China-North Korea border and founded Crossing Borders, a nonprofit dedicated to providing humanitarian assistance to North Korean refugees. He is the author of the Wall Street Journal featured book Escaping North Korea: Defiance and Hope in the World’s Most Repressive Country, a current events memoir published in 2008 by Rowman & Littlefield, about his experiences at the China-North Korea border when taking time off from business to help North Korean refugees and human trafficking victims through the modern-day 6,000 mile underground railroad in Asia. Escaping North Korea has been translated into Turkish and Polish. The book is being developed into a feature film with actor/producer Daniel Dae Kim (Lost, Hawaii Five-O).

Crossing Borders 

On New Year's Day 2003, Kim decided to take some time off of business and gave up his financial planning business in Chicago, Illinois, and left for China on a one-way ticket carrying little more than two duffle bags. While living near the North Korean border, he operated undercover as a student of North Korean taekwondo, training under two North Korean masters —eventually receiving a second-degree blackbelt (he is also a Brazilian Jiujitsu purple belt). He founded Crossing Borders, a nonprofit dedicated to providing humanitarian assistance to North Korean refugees. In his book, he estimated that during his time on the field over 60% of female defectors were victims of sex trafficking. The organization has been a regular contributor to the State Department's Annual Trafficking in Persons Report and has testified at a congressional hearing on the topic of combating human trafficking in China.

Media and events 

Kim frequently appears in the media: He was a guest on The Daily Show with Jon Stewart and has appeared in The Wall Street Journal and on CNN Anderson Cooper 360. He has been interviewed by major international media groups such as Fox News, CNN, BBC, Reuters, Canadian Broadcasting Corporation, Yonhap News Agency, The Korea Times, The Korea Daily, and Korean Broadcasting System. Kim speaks to audiences worldwide, including a variety of companies, universities, and government organizations on five continents.

Escaping North Korea: The Movie 

The interview with Jon Stewart resulted in interest from Hollywood in turning Escaping North Korea into a motion picture. The book-to-film project is in development with actor/producer Daniel Dae Kim (Lost, Hawaii Five-O).

Career after China-North Korea 

Kim received his MBA from Georgetown University's McDonough School of Business. He is also a 1999 graduate from the University of Illinois at Urbana-Champaign. In interviews, Kim has referred to the late Ambassador Mark Palmer as a mentor and a person who has deeply influenced him by his example of working effectively in the business, nonprofit, and government sectors. Palmer wrote the foreword to Escaping North Korea and commented, “This is a story of heroes. Of North Koreans increasingly and courageously evading the dictates of the system at home to survive and risking their lives to flee the world's most repressive dictatorship. And of a heroic young Korean American, the author, Mike Kim, who risked his own life for four years on the China-North Korea border to help them."

In June 2010, Kim was voted in as a term member of the Council on Foreign Relations.

Kim now serves as a Crossing Borders board member and donor.

Kim writes for The Huffington Post Blog and CNN Opinion.

References

External links 
 Escaping North Korea Website
 Interview on The Daily Show with Jon Stewart
 Interview on CNN's Anderson Cooper 360
 Interview on Fox with Bill Hemmer
Yonhap News Agency Interview 

University of Illinois Urbana-Champaign alumni
McDonough School of Business alumni
American investigative journalists
American writers of Korean descent
1976 births
Living people
Experts on North Korea
American male journalists